The Tundra Yukaghir language (also known as Northern Yukaghir; self-designation: Вадул аруу) is one of only two extant Yukaghir languages.
Last spoken in the tundra belt extending between the lower Indigirka to the lower Kolyma basin, Tundra Yukaghir was formerly spoken in a much wider area extending west to the Lena basin.

Classification and grammatical features
The relationship of the Yukaghir languages with other language families is uncertain, though it has been suggested that they are distantly related to the Uralic languages, thus forming the putative Uralic–Yukaghir language family.

Tundra and Kolyma Yukaghir are the only two remnants of what used to be one of the dominant languages/language families of northeastern Siberia, spreading from the River Anadyr in the east to the River Lena in the west. On the basis of the evidence of early sources, it can be assumed that there existed a Yukaghir dialect continuum, with what is today Tundra Yukaghir and Kolyma Yukaghir at the extremes.

Tundra Yukaghir and Kolyma Yukaghir are not mutually intelligible. Both Yukaghir languages have residual vowel harmony and a complex phonotactics of consonants, rich agglutinative morphology and are strictly head-final. They has practically no finite subordination and very few coordinate structures. Yukaghir has a split intransitive alignment system based on discourse-pragmatic features. In absence of narrow focus, the system is organised on a nominative–accusative basis; when focused, direct objects and subjects of intransitive verbs are co-aligned (special focus case, special focus agreement).

Orthography

Phonology

Vowels

Consonants

¹The uvular fricative  is realized as a stop  after .

Phonotactics
Syllable structure is CVC, i.e. up to one consonant can occur at the beginning or end of a word and up to two in the middle.

Grammar
Tundra Yukaghir is largely head-final and dependent-marking: the default position for the verb is at the end of the clause, nouns are marked for case, adjectives precede nouns and relative clauses precede main clauses.

Case assignment for core participants behaves in a broadly split-intransitive manner, though actual assignment is very complex, involving semantic role, focus, relative animacy of the participants (first or second person versus third), and nature of the noun itself. The assigned cases are primary (used for focused or high animacy nominative arguments), neutral (for low animacy nominative arguments and high animacy accusative ones), and focus case (most focused accusative arguments). Indexation of arguments on the verb is similarly conditioned by focus and animacy as well as mood.

Oblique cases include dative, instrumental, comitative, locative, ablative, prolative, and transformative, the latter indicating the intended use or function of an argument.

There is limited incorporation, used in reflexive constructions.

Tundra Yukaghir verbs are marked for switch reference. Besides indicating whether the verb of a following clause shares the same subject, the switch-reference markers also describe the temporal relationship between clauses, the connection between the actions involved, and in the case of different subjects, the person (first or second versus third) and number of the subject.

References

External links
 Elena Maslova's pages on Yukaghir
 Universal Declaration of Human Rights in Tundra Yukaghir
 The poetry of the Yukaghir (translated to English)

Agglutinative languages
Endangered languages
Languages of Russia
Tundra
Subject–object–verb languages